José Joaquín Torres Cadena (born July 15, 1952), also known as J.J. Torres, is a former association football referee from Colombia. 

Torres served as a FIFA referee for several international tournaments, including the 1989 FIFA World Youth Championship and the 1992 Summer Olympics. He also worked as a referee for the 1994 World Cup's South American qualifiers.

Torres is mostly known for supervising four matches in the 1994 FIFA World Cup in the United States. He officiated two group stage matches: the first one between Belgium and Morocco and the second one between the Republic of Ireland and Norway, as well as the quarter-final match between Germany and Bulgaria and the semi-final match between Brazil and Sweden.

References

 Profile

1952 births
Colombian football referees
FIFA World Cup referees
Living people
Copa América referees
1994 FIFA World Cup referees
Olympic football referees